Motorcycle trials, also known as observed trials, often called simply trial/s (with or without the plural "s"), is a non-speed event on specialized motorcycles. The sport is most popular in the United Kingdom and Spain, though there are participants around the globe.

Modern trials motorcycles are distinctive in that they have evolved to become extremely lightweight, lack seating (they are designed to be ridden standing up) and have suspension travel that is short, relative to a motocross or enduro motorcycle.

Motorcycle trials is often utilized by competitors in other motorcycle sports (such as enduro, motocross or road racers) as a way to cross-train, as trials requires fine throttle, balance, and machine control.

Characteristics
The event is split into sections where a competitor rides through an obstacle course while attempting to avoid touching the ground with their feet. The obstacles in the course may be of natural or constructed elements. In all sections, regardless of content, the designated route is carefully contrived to test the skill of the rider. In many local observed trials events, the sections are divided into separate courses to accommodate the different skill level of riders, who compete in skill-rated classes.

In every section, the competitor is scored by an observer (hence the sport's name) who counts how many times the competitor touches the ground with the foot (or any other part of the body). Each time a competitor touches the ground with a foot (commonly called "dabs" or "prods"), the penalty is one point. 

The possible scores in each section consist of 0, 1, 2, 3, or 5. If a competitor makes their way through the section without touching the ground with a foot, they earn a score of 0 (which is called "cleaning the section"). If they touch the ground once, they receive a score of 1. If they touch down twice, they receive a score of 2. If they touch the ground three or more times, they earn a score of 3—as long as they complete the section without stalling the motor, dismounting, going out of bounds, or going backward. If the competitor fails to complete the section a score of 5 (sometimes colourfully called "a fiasco") is earned. The winner is the competitor with the fewest points at the end of the event. Some events are also timed with penalty points assessed to late riders.

There is a world indoor and outdoor championship, as well as indoor and outdoor national team "world cups" (Trial des Nations). British competitor Dougie Lampkin is notable for winning seven world outdoor titles in the 1990s and 2000s, the same number that Spanish competitor Jordi Tarrés won in the 1980s and 1990s. Previous observed trials greats include Northern Ireland's Sammy Miller (1960s), Finland's Yrjö Vesterinen (1970s) and Belgium's Eddy Lejeune (1980s). The current outdoor world champion is Antoni Bou from Spain who is also the current indoor champion. He has been the sole outdoor and indoor FIM Trial World Championship champion from 2007 to 2022. With these 32 world titles (16 outdoor and 16 indoor), he is the most successful rider in history, surpassing Dougie Lampkin (7 outdoor and 5 indoor) and Jordi Tarrés who is third with 7 outdoor titles.

In addition to the world championship events, there are other major events, such as the Scottish Six Days Trial (SSDT) and the Scott Trial.

Major current manufacturers of trials bikes are Gas Gas, Beta, Sherco, Montesa Honda, Scorpa, TRS and Vertigo. In the past there have been many manufacturers, from countries such as Spain, Japan, Britain and Italy.

Classic classes exist for vintage bikes. Classes include pre-1965 or pre-1967 motorcycles (typically British), as well as newer vintage events for observed trials motorcycles with two rear shock absorbers. In most cases, twin-shock motorcycles were manufactured between 1967 and 1985 and are typically Japanese or Spanish. A recent addition has been a class for air-cooled monoshock bikes, this covers machines up to around 1990.

A competition event is called an "observed trial" or "trial" (not plural), unless referred to as an "observed trials event". A newer name for the sport, MotoTrial, is used by some organizations. However, it was recently dropped by the Federation Internationale de Motocyclisme as a name for its observed trials competitions. Outdoor events are called Trial, while FIM indoor events are called X-Trial.

Sidecar trials

As well as the traditional solo motorcycle trials, there is a form of the sport on 3 wheels known as Sidecar Trials consisting of a driver and a passenger. The competition is run in the same way as a standard motorcycle trial with the only exception being additional ways to be given a score of 5. This involves the passenger, who will earn the competitor a 5 if any part of the passenger's body touches any terrain. The role of the passenger is to balance the sidecar and prevent the sidecar wheel from lifting which would cause the driver to restablise the outfit by using his foot (incurring a score of 1).

Sidecar Trials is predominantly British, however there are events run in Europe and Australia. The British Championship is the highest level of competition, held over 10 rounds with 3 difficulty levels; Clubman, Intermediate & Expert, with the Expert class championship winner being named British Sidecar Trials Champion.

Long distance trials

Long distance trials competition incorporates a carefully planned out route for the competitors to follow and make stops at various locations incorporating places throughout many different counties, rather than one venue.  This takes place not only on the main roads but also steep, rough and loose surfaced hills and lanes.  Points are given to the competitor for putting his foot down on the ground or falling off.  These trials can be expected to be completed within certain timescales and can mean not arriving at a particular section and or destination prior to an allocated time.

Not only modern motorcycles take part but vintage motorcycles and cars too.

See also
 Mountain bike trials
 Kick Start, a long running British television show
 Gymkhana (motorcycle)
 List of motorcycle trials champions
 List of motorcycle manufacturers
 Outline of motorcycles and motorcycling
 Truck trials

References

External links
 International Motorcycling Federation - Trials
 Trials in the United States
 US Trial des Nations
 AutoCycle Union - ACU, The UK Governing body

 
Dirt biking
Motorcycle racing by type
Off-road racing